Psammophis subtaeniatus, the western yellow-bellied sand snake, is a snake found in northern Southern Africa; more specifically the north of KwaZulu-Natal and further north to Mozambique, Zimbabwe, Gauteng, North West, Limpopo, and Eswatini. It is also found in eastern and northern Botswana, northern Namibia, Angola, and Zambia.

The snake is oviparous and lays 4 to 10 eggs in summer. The young are about 20 cm long when they hatch. The snake's venom is not considered harmful and poses no danger to humans.

References 

Psammophis
Snakes of Africa
Reptiles of South Africa
Taxa named by Wilhelm Peters
Reptiles described in 1882